Cottonwood is an unincorporated community in southeastern Callahan County, Texas, United States, on FM 880, eight miles northwest of Cross Plains.  It was first settled by J. W. Love in 1875, under the name Cottonwood Springs.  The name was shortened to Cottonwood when a post office was established there.  The town has a community center, active church of Christ and Baptist Church congregations, a Methodist Church building, and a volunteer fire department.

Cottonwood is part of the Abilene, Texas Metropolitan Statistical Area.

History

Cottonwood Springs 
 
A historical marker just outside the town reads as follows:

After Indians on High Plains were subdued (1874) by Gen. R. S. MacKenzie, settlers started to pour into this area, where they found abundant game, water, and good soil for ranching, farming. Cottonwood Springs, at head of Green Briar Creek, was one of first villages founded (in 1875). The town soon became a trading center for southeastern part of county. It had several stores, two churches, and a school; and although usually peaceful, it experienced many gun battles. The town name was shortened to "Cottonwood" after first post office was established in 1883.

Bank and Post Office 
In the center of the town, a building labeled "Cottonwood Texas" still stands, which was once the town's bank and post office.  Its historical marker reads,

W. F. Griffin opened a bank about 1911 in this small frame building. With Griffin as a director, Paul Ramsey served as the first president. His duties included teller, cashier, loan officer and custodian. When the railroad bypassed Cottonwood, merchants and residents moved away. In January 1915, the bank closed. In 1918 Hazel Respess opened a post office in the building and ran it for the next 50 years. In 1975, postal service here was stopped. This spot has been a gathering place for the community.

Demographics 

In 1890, the population of the town was 390, but by 1990 it had been reduced to 65.  Although small, Cottonwood is still an active community.

References 

 Brown, Teri. "Cottonwood Texas Landmarks." Online: https://web.archive.org/web/20060207125055/http://www.cottonwoodtexas.com/landmarks/landmarks.html (accessed December 7, 2005).
 Handbook of Texas Online, s.v. "COTTONWOOD, TX," https://tshaonline.org/handbook/online/articles/hncaa (accessed August 27, 2015).
 Texas Historic Sites Atlas, s.v. "Cottonwood Springs, Site of." http://atlas.thc.state.tx.us (accessed December 6, 2005).
 Texas Historic Sites Atlas, s.v. "Cottonwood Bank and Post Office." http://atlas.thc.state.tx.us (accessed December 6, 2005).

External links
 CottonwoodTexas.com

Unincorporated communities in Callahan County, Texas
Unincorporated communities in Texas
Abilene metropolitan area
Populated places established in 1875
1875 establishments in Texas